Varaita Valley (in Italian Valle Varaita) is a valley in south-west of Piedmont, in the Province of Cuneo - Italy.

Etymology
It takes its name from the Varaita, a right-hand tributary of the Po which flows through the valley.

Geography
Close the French border the valley is divided in two sub-valleys named Valle di Bellino (south) and Valle di Chianale (north), which meet near Casteldelfino.

The municipalities of Varaita Valley are Bellino, Brossasco, Casteldelfino, Costigliole Saluzzo, Frassino, Isasca, Melle, Piasco, Pontechianale, Rossana, Sampeyre, Valmala, Venasca and Verzuolo.

Notable summits
The most important mountains of the valley are the Monviso (3.841 m) and its subpeaks.

Other relevant summits of the valley, all belonging to the Cottian Alps, are:

 Valle di Chianale:
 Monte Losetta - 3054 m
 Monte Ruine - 3143 m
 Monte Aiguillette - 3298 m
 Pic d'Asti - 3219 m
Rocca Bianca - 3064 m
 Monte Pelvo - 3024 m
 Valle di Bellino:
 Mongioia - 3340 m
 Testa di Malacosta - 3212 m
 Monte Ferra - 3094 m
 Testa di Malacosta - 3212 m
 Pelvo di Ciabrera - 3152 m
 Pelvo d'Elva - 3046 m
 Mid and lowest part of the valley:
 Punta Rasciassa - 2664 m
 Monte Nebin - 2510 m
 Testa di Garitta Nuova - 2385 m
 Monte Birrone - 2131 m
 Monte Ricordone - 1764 m
 Monte san Bernardo - 1625 m

Access
The valley can be reached by car/bus from Po Plain following the strada provinciale della Valle Varaita; it also can be accessed by the French region of Queyras by the Collle dell'Agnello, the third highest Alpine pass crossed by an asphalted road.

See also
 Cottian Alps

Notes and references

External links
 http://www.vallevaraita.cn.it/ 

Varaita
Varaita
Province of Cuneo